Castrop-Rauxel Hauptbahnhof is a railway station in the German city of Castrop-Rauxel. It is situated on the S2 line of the Rhine-Ruhr S-Bahn, stopping every half hour. Additional, the RE 3 (Rhein-Emscher-Express) and the RB32 (Rhein-Emscher-Bahn) both stop hourly.

History
The station was opened in 1848 as part of the trunk line of the former Cologne-Minden Railway Company. Castrop station was opened for passenger services with this section of the line on 15 May 1847. Facilities were built at the station up to 1862 for handling freight.

About 1880 the station was renamed Rauxel, as the station was located in that municipality at the time. After the municipal reform the mid-20th century, which merged of the towns of Castrop and Rauxel, the station was renamed again as Castrop-Rauxel Hauptbahnhof in about 1962.

References

External links
 
 

Railway stations in North Rhine-Westphalia
Rhine-Ruhr S-Bahn stations
S2 (Rhine-Ruhr S-Bahn)
Railway stations in Germany opened in 1847
1847 establishments in Prussia